Macduff railway station was a railway station serving the settlements of Banff and Macduff, Aberdeenshire, Scotland. It was the terminus of a branch line from Inveramsay. It was opened in 1872 by Banff, Macduff and Turriff Junction Railway which was later absorbed by the Great North of Scotland Railway.

Prior to the station being built, Macduff was served by Banff & Macduff station, almost a mile from the town.

The preceding station on the line into Macduff was Banff Bridge, on the Macduff side of the bridge leading to neighbouring Banff. Banff itself had  Banff Harbour station on a different line.

Macduff station was closed for passenger traffic from 1 October 1951 and completely in 1961 when freight traffic ceased.

References

Disused railway stations in Aberdeenshire
Former Great North of Scotland Railway stations
Railway stations in Great Britain opened in 1872
Railway stations in Great Britain closed in 1951
1961 disestablishments in Scotland
1872 establishments in Scotland
Macduff, Aberdeenshire